Down Darker Trails is a 2017 role-playing game supplement published by Chaosium for Call of Cthulhu.

Contents
Down Darker Trails is a sourcebook set in the American old west.

Reception
John O'Neill reviewed Down Darker Trails for Black Gate, and stated that "CoC has been sorely lacking a weird western sourcebook, so I was very pleased to see Kevin Ross and his friends at Chaosium release Down Darker Trails, a massive full-color 256-page hardcover which lovingly brings Mythos horror to the old west. The book is an excellent addition to Chaosium's catalog".

Down Darker Trails won the 2018 Silver ENnie Awards for Best Monster/Adversary.

References

External links
Down Darker Trails at RPGGeek

Call of Cthulhu (role-playing game) supplements
ENnies winners
Role-playing game supplements introduced in 2017